Natas do Céu ("cream of the sky" or "heavenly cream") is a layered Portuguese dessert. It consists of whipped cream topped with egg cream, with crumbled cookies at the bottom. The dessert has some similarities to Spanish natillas.

See also 
 Portuguese cuisine
 List of Portuguese dishes

References 

Portuguese desserts